Jeffrey D. Levine (born 1955) was nominated by U.S. President Barack Obama to be the United States Ambassador to Estonia on February 17, 2012  and was confirmed by the United States Senate on March 29, 2012.  He presented his credentials to President of Estonia Toomas Hendrik Ilves on September 17, 2012. He left his post in 2015.

Early life and education
Growing up in the San Francisco Bay Area, he holds a bachelor's degree in journalism from California State University, Humboldt and a master's degree in Resource Strategy from the National Defense University in Washington D.C.

Career
Before joining the Department of State, Jeff Levine worked as a newspaper reporter for seven years and was a founding staff member of USA Today, one of the largest newspapers in the United States.

Public service
Levine joined the Foreign Service in 1985.

At the United States Department of State, he served in the Operations Center as desk officer for Hungary and as a special assistant to the Under Secretary for Management.

He served as Deputy Chief of Mission/Chargé d'Affaires at the U.S. Embassy in Budapest, Hungary from 2007 to 2010.

In addition to his assignment in Hungary, he served as Deputy Chief of Mission in Sofia, Bulgaria and has also been posted to Brasilia, Brazil; Nicosia, Cyprus; Alexandria, Egypt; Kuala Lumpur, Malaysia and Lima, Peru.

Levine is a member of the Senior Foreign Service with the rank of Minister Counselor.  At the time of his nomination, he had been the State Department's director of Recruitment, Examination and Employment since September 2010.

Levine has received numerous Department of State awards as well as the Golden Laurel Medal, presented by the Government of Bulgaria.

Personal life
Jeff Levine is married to Janie L. Keeler and has a son, Nick.

Levine has studied Spanish, Portuguese, Bulgarian and Hungarian and is currently taking Estonian lessons.

References

External links

Official website: Ambassador 
Official website: Ambassador’s Speeches
Official website: Ambassador Levine's Interview with Delfi's Readers
Official website: History
Testimony of Jeffrey D. Levine Ambassador-Designate to the Republic of Estonia, Senate Foreign Relations Committee

1955 births
Living people
Ambassadors of the United States to Estonia
American male journalists
Date of birth missing (living people)
California State Polytechnic University, Humboldt alumni
National Defense University alumni
Place of birth missing (living people)
United States Foreign Service personnel